The Cobandi, Greek Kobandoi, were a Germanic tribe mentioned in Ptolemy's Geography (2.10), who lived in Jutland.

See also
List of Germanic peoples

Early Germanic peoples